Stamnoctenis rubrosuffusa is a species of geometrid moth in the family Geometridae.

The MONA or Hodges number for Stamnoctenis rubrosuffusa is 7358.

References

Further reading

 
 

Stamnodini
Articles created by Qbugbot
Moths described in 1912